The 2nd Golden Globe Awards, honoring the best achievements in 1944 filmmaking, were announced in February 1945 and held on April 16, 1945, at The Beverly Hills Hotel in Beverly Hills, California.

Winners
The 2nd Golden Globe Awards were presented on April 16, 1945, during a dinner in the Terrace Room of The Beverly Hills Hotel in Beverly Hills, California. B.G. DeSylva accepted the Best Picture award.

Best Picture
 Going My Way directed by Leo McCarey

Best Actor in a Leading Role
 Alexander Knox – Wilson

Best Actress in a Leading Role
 Ingrid Bergman – Gaslight

Best Performance by an Actor in a Supporting Role in a Motion Picture
 Barry Fitzgerald – Going My Way

Best Performance by an Actress in a Supporting Role in a Motion Picture
 Agnes Moorehead – Mrs. Parkington

Best Director – Motion Picture
 Leo McCarey – Going My Way

See also
 Hollywood Foreign Press Association
 17th Academy Awards
 1944 in film

References

002
1944 film awards
January 1945 events in the United States